Jean-Jacques Conilh de Beyssac (12 June 1890 – 13 June 1918) was a rugby union player, who represented  on five occasions. He died in the First World War.

References

Bibliography

1890 births
1918 deaths
French rugby union players
France international rugby union players
French military personnel killed in World War I
Sportspeople from Bordeaux
Stade Bordelais players
Rugby union props
Rugby union locks